Phospholipid-transporting ATPase VA also known as ATPase class V type 10A  or aminophospholipid translocase VA is an enzyme that in humans is encoded by the ATP10A gene.

Function 

The protein encoded by ATP10A belongs to the family of P-type cation transport ATPases, and to the subfamily of aminophospholipid-transporting ATPases. The aminophospholipid translocases transport phosphatidylserine and phosphatidylethanolamine from one side of a bilayer to another. This gene is maternally expressed. It maps within the most common interval of deletion responsible for Angelman syndrome, also known as 'happy puppet syndrome'.

See also 
 Haloacid dehydrogenase superfamily

References

External links

Further reading

EC 7.6.2